Big Rock Interchange is the I-430/I-630/Chenal Parkway interchange in west Little Rock, Arkansas. The name is derived from a large rock formation discovered during expansion.

The interchange was originally constructed in 1977, then in the mid-2000s it was decided to expand the interchange to alleviate congestion. In 2011 an outcropping of Pennsylvanian Jackfork Formation sandstone and surrounding shale was discovered in the southeast quadrant of the project. The formation was estimated to weigh about 5 million pounds. Due to the size and hardness of the sandstone it was decided to leave the unique and distinctive formation in place as a landmark, rather than use explosives or some other method to try to remove it, and it was dubbed "The Big Rock".

When the original I-430 and I-630 interchange was constructed, about 14,000 vehicles a day traveled down each Interstate, and I-630 ended at Shakleford Road with a traffic signal. With expansion and growth in west Little Rock, and particularly in the Chenal Valley neighborhood, the interchange had become progressively more congested by the early 2000s. In 2004 the Arkansas Highway and Transportation Department began a study to expand the interchange. The first of three phases began January 2009. First phase was construction of an additional I-630 west to I-430 north lane, modification to Financial Centre Parkway (Chenal Parkway) just west of Shackleford Road, and an additional traffic signal added to Hermitage Drive. Phase two involved preparing the interchange for future work and mainly involved the I-430 bridge over I-630 which was lengthened. Phase three completed the flyover lanes. The $150 million makeover took over six years to complete. In the end it eased congestion for over 200,000 vehicles that use the interchange daily.

Sources 
 Arkansas Highways
 Arkansas Online
 AMP
 Arkansas Geological

Transportation in Arkansas
Interstate 30
Interstate Highways in Arkansas
Transportation in Little Rock, Arkansas
Transportation in Pulaski County, Arkansas
Road interchanges in the United States